The suburbs of Canberra are organised into a hierarchy of districts, town centres, group centres, local suburbs and other industrial areas and villages. While these divisions have no formal role in the governance or administration of the city, they formed a basis for the planning and development of the city and are significant to the city's commercial and social activities.

For a complete list, see List of Canberra suburbs

Suburbs

Most suburbs of Canberra are designed around local shops, centrally located within walking distance of the outer parts of the suburb. Consequently, they are generally smaller in size to the suburbs of other cities. A typical Canberra suburb is bounded on all sides by major roads, and at the centre, contains local shops, or at least a local store. Some also contain a petrol station, a church, or other community facilities. Many also contain a primary school and a preschool.

As a result of these commercial and community facilities being located in the centre of suburbs, Canberra lacks strip shopping along major roads and appears to be 'empty' to most visitors. In the older areas, major roads are lined with houses, and in the newer areas they are typically landscaped with mounds of earth and vegetation to form 'parkways'.

Districts 
   
Canberra's residential districts were developed with the intention of being semi-self-contained satellite towns with an intended population of about 80,000 people. The districts contain town centres which serve as commercial, transport and employment nodes. The districts are separated by nature reserves, and in most cases were designed according to a policy of ridges and valleys where the urban areas were located in valleys, separated by ridges, containing nature parks. There are seven districts in Canberra, each is divided into between eight and 25 suburbs, but on average about eighteen. Canberra's Territory Plan also contains districts located outside of the urban areas for the purposes of land administration.

In chronological order of mass residential development, the districts are:

The City Centre

Canberra's central business district, also known as Civic, is the main commercial centre in Canberra. It is larger than the town centres and contains many Australian Government department offices, large office buildings and retail outlets such as department stores and specialty stores and recreational facilities such as cinemas, bars, nightclubs, restaurants and theatres. The Australian Capital Territory Legislative Assembly is contained within its boundaries; as is the Canberra Theatre and Playhouse, Territory Courts, and the Federal Court.

Town centres

Outside Canberra's central business district, there are five town centres within Canberra. As well as serving as commercial nodes, town centres also serve as centres of employment. Most contain at least one major Australia government department. For example:
 Belconnen Town Centre contains the head offices of the Department of Immigration and Border Protection and the Australian Bureau of Statistics; 
 Tuggeranong Town Centre contains the head offices of the Department of Social Services and the Executive Agency Services Australia; and
 Woden Town Centre contains the head office of the Department of Health.

, neither the Weston Creek Centre nor the Gungahlin Town Centre contain any substantive Australian government department head office.

Town centres also provide services such as mechanical workshops, gyms, pubs and clubs, cinemas, restaurants and fast food outlets, petrol stations and car dealerships. They also usually contain a public library, police station and a community centre. The Woden Town Centre has high rise office buildings and resembles a 'mini city centre'.

Group centres

 
Group centres are commercial and community centres smaller than town centres but larger than local shops which are designed to serve a "group" of suburbs – typically about four or five. A typical group centre contains such local commercial facilities such as a supermarket, a petrol station, specialty stores such as a pharmacy, hairdresser, butcher, video store, baker, deli, health food store, betting agency and medical centre. Some larger group centres may also contain banks, a few restaurants and fast food outlets. They will typically also contain recreational and social facilities such as a swimming pool, church, and a tavern or club. These are intended to provide "weekly shopping" type services to the residents of adjoining suburbs.

Industrial areas
The suburbs of Mitchell, Fyshwick and Hume are Canberra's industrial areas and are located away from residential suburbs. While they are the location of light industry (Canberra has no heavy industries), they also contain a large number of retail outlets such as furniture stores, hardware stores, car dealerships, bicycle shops, camping stores and wholesale outlets.

Villages
The Australian Capital Territory also contains a number of smaller villages located outside the urban area. Historically some of these are farming or forestry villages and some were damaged or destroyed in the fires of January 2003. The village closest to the urban area is Hall which is located just past Belconnen near the New South Wales border.

See also

 Canberra

Notes

References